On 5 April 2017, a suicide bomber killed at least eight people and wounded 24 near a Pakistan Army vehicle taking part in the census in the city of Lahore, Pakistan. The injured were shifted to the Combined Military Hospital (CMH) and General Hospital. Tehreek-i-Taliban Pakistan claimed responsibility, saying it was carried out in revenge against security personnel.

On the 8th of April, Pakistani police killed 10 Taliban gunmen in a gun battle in Lahore.

See also 
 February 2017 Lahore suicide bombing

References

2017 murders in Pakistan
Suicide bombings in 2017
21st-century mass murder in Pakistan
2010s in Lahore
April 2017 crimes in Asia
Mass murder in 2017
Mass murder in Pakistan
Suicide bombings in Pakistan
Terrorist incidents in Lahore
Terrorist incidents in Pakistan in 2017
Tehrik-i-Taliban Pakistan attacks